The Fulton Street Line or East New York Line was a streetcar line in Brooklyn, New York City, running mainly along Fulton Street between Fulton Ferry and East New York. In 1941, the streetcar line was replaced by the B25 bus route, operated by the New York City Transit Authority.

Route description
The B25 bus route runs along Old Fulton Street and Fulton Street between Fulton Ferry and the Broadway Junction subway station in East New York, except in Downtown Brooklyn, where a block of the street past Borough Hall is closed. Along the way, subway transfers can be made at Court Street–Borough Hall, Jay Street–MetroTech, DeKalb Avenue, and at various points along the IND Fulton Street Line. The route is based out of East New York Bus Depot.

History
The Brooklyn City Rail Road opened a line along Fulton Street from Fulton Ferry on July 6, 1854; it reached East New York by 1874. Buses were substituted for streetcars on August 10, 1941. In 1998, the line was extended further into DUMBO to Water Street and Main Street during the daytime hours on weekdays. This was at the request of a real estate developer who had paid an annual fee of $90,000 to the Transit Authority to operate the service. The fee has not been paid since 2000, but the part-time extension remained in effect. Service to Main Street began operating at all times in 2011.

On December 1, 2022, the MTA released a draft redesign of the Brooklyn bus network. As part of the redesign, the B25 would maintain its existing routing, along with the elimination of closely spaced stops, but would end at Franklin Avenue overnight, with the B26 taking over service on Fulton Street west of this point.

References

External links

Streetcar lines in Brooklyn
B025
B025